The 1893 Cincinnati football team was an American football team that represented the University of Cincinnati as an independent during the 1893 college football season. The team compiled a 0–6 record. Dan Laurence and Russell Reeder were the team captains. The team had no head coach and played its home games at Union Ball Park in Cincinnati.

Schedule

References

Cincinnati
Cincinnati Bearcats football seasons
College football winless seasons
Cincinnati football